Laura Gotti (born 14 June 1991) is a female Italian long-distance runner who won a silver medal at the 2018 European Athletics Championships.

Biography
Laura Gotti in 2018 was able to qualify for the European Athletics Championships and won the silver medal in the team competition, despite having closed the marathon race in 46th and last position, more than half an hour from the predecessor who had preceded he, by virtue of the EAA rules that rewards the medal for all the athletes who have arrived at the finish line, even if the team's time is calculated only by the sum of the first three athletes of the team who are part of the finish line.

Achievements

See also
 Italy at the 2018 European Athletics Championships

References

External links
 

1991 births
Living people
Italian female long-distance runners
Italian female marathon runners
Sportspeople from the Province of Brescia
People from Iseo, Lombardy